Guthman is a surname. Notable people with the surname include:

 Edwin O. Guthman (1919–2008), American journalist and university professor
 Gary Guthman (born 1952), American jazz musician
 Les Guthman, American director, writer, and production executive

See also
 Gutmann (disambiguation)
 Guttman